Golden Beach is a natural urban beach located along the Bay of Bengal in Chennai, Tamil Nadu, India. VGP Golden Beach is a major tourist attraction in Chennai. It is situated on the East Coast Road, the seaside road from Chennai to Cuddalore via Pondicherry.

References 

Tourist attractions in Chennai
Beaches of Tamil Nadu
Geography of Chennai